John Folger may refer to:
 John Hamlin Folger (1880–1963), U.S. congressman from North Carolina
 John Clifford Folger (1893–1981), American diplomat